Mpulungu is a constituency of the National Assembly of Zambia. It covers the towns of Chasaya, Chisongo and Mpulungu in Mpulungu District of Northern Province.

List of MPs

References

Constituencies of the National Assembly of Zambia
1968 establishments in Zambia
Constituencies established in 1968